Khalaj Mahalleh (also Romanized as Khalaj Maḩalleh; also known as Khalaj Maḩalleh-ye Lavandevīl) is a village in Chelevand Rural District, Lavandevil District, Astara County, Gilan Province, Iran. At the 2006 census, its population was 977, in 238 families.

References 

Populated places in Astara County